Joane is a civil parish in the municipality of Vila Nova de Famalicão, Portugal. The population in 2011 was 8,089, in an area of 7.32 km2. It is the birthplace of Bernardino Machado, two times President of Portugal during the First Republic.

References

Freguesias of Vila Nova de Famalicão